Carex tuckermanii, commonly known as Tuckerman's sedge, is a species of true sedge in the family Cyperaceae. It is a perennial plant native to North America.

Conservation status
Carex tuckermanii is listed as endangered in Illinois, Maryland, Massachusetts, and New Jersey. It is also listed as a special concern species in Connecticut.

References

tuckermanii
Flora of North America